The 2021–22 New Orleans Pelicans season was the 20th season of the New Orleans Pelicans franchise in the National Basketball Association (NBA). On June 16, 2021, coach Stan Van Gundy agreed to part ways with the Pelicans after one season. The Pelicans soon hired Willie Green as the next head coach.

On December 15, Devonte' Graham, who was acquired from the Charlotte Hornets in the offseason, hit an 61–foot shot to hoist the Pelicans to an 113–110 win over the Oklahoma City Thunder. The shot set the NBA record for the longest buzzer–beating game–winner in league history, beating out Mahmoud Abdul-Rauf's 55–foot shot in 1992 for the Denver Nuggets, 109–106 victory over the Los Angeles Clippers.

Despite finishing the season with a 36–46 record and being 10 games under .500, the Pelicans managed to qualify for the play-in tournament after a win over the Sacramento Kings, followed by a Lakers loss to the Suns on April 5, 2022. They defeated both the San Antonio Spurs and the Los Angeles Clippers in the Play-In tournament to qualify for the playoffs for the first time since 2018, becoming the first team to qualify for the postseason with a 36–46 record since the Boston Celtics in 2004. They faced the top-seeded Phoenix Suns in the first round where they lost in six games.

Draft 

The Pelicans currently hold one first-round pick and two second-round picks entering the draft.

Roster

Roster Notes
Power forward Zion Williamson missed the entire season due to foot and knee injuries.

Standings

Division

Conference

Game log

Preseason 

|-style="background:#fcc;"
| 1
| October 4
| @ Minnesota
| 
| Nickeil Alexander-Walker (22)
| Hart, Marshall (7)
| Tomáš Satoranský (4)
| Target Center5,715
| 0–1
|-style="background:#cfc;"
| 2
| October 6
| Orlando
| 
| Trey Murphy III (20)
| Jonas Valančiūnas (9)
| Devonte' Graham (7)
| Smoothie King Center12,407
| 1–1
|-style="background:#fcc;"
| 3
| October 8
| @ Chicago
| 
| Trey Murphy III (17)
| Trey Murphy III (10)
| Jonas Valančiūnas (3)
| United Center13,909
| 1–2
|-style="background:#fcc;"
| 4
| October 11
| @ Utah
| 
| Devonte' Graham (14)
| Jonas Valančiūnas (6)
| Lewis Jr., Murphy III (4)
| Vivint Arena15,535
| 1–3

Regular season 

|-style="background:#fcc;"
| 1
| October 20
| Philadelphia
| 
| Brandon Ingram (25)
| Jonas Valančiūnas (12)
| Brandon Ingram (6)
| Smoothie King Center12,845
| 0–1
|-style="background:#fcc;"
| 2
| October 22
| @ Chicago
| 
| Brandon Ingram (26)
| Ingram, Valančiūnas (8)
| Brandon Ingram (8)
| United Center20,996
| 0–2
|-style="background:#fcc;"
| 2
| October 23
| @ Minnesota
|  
| Brandon Ingram (30)
| Jonas Valančiūnas (17)
| Brandon Ingram (4)
| Target Center15,343
| 0–3
|-style="background:#cfc;"
| 4
| October 25
| @ Minnesota
|  
| Brandon Ingram (27)
| Jonas Valančiūnas (23)
| Devonte' Graham (7)
| Target Center14,435
| 1–3
|-style="background:#fcc;"
| 5
| October 27
| Atlanta
| 
| Devonte' Graham (21)
| Jonas Valančiūnas (15)
| Ingram, Marshall (4)
| Smoothie King Center15,541
| 1–4
|-style="background:#fcc;"
| 6
| October 29
| Sacramento
| 
| Jonas Valančiūnas (24)
| Jonas Valančiūnas (13)
| Brandon Ingram (6)
| Smoothie King Center17,507
| 1–5
|-style="background:#fcc;"
| 7
| October 30
| New York
| 
| Jonas Valančiūnas (27)
| Jonas Valančiūnas (14)
| Devonte' Graham (8)
| Smoothie King Center16,508
| 1–6

|-style="background:#fcc;"
| 8
| November 2
| @ Phoenix
| 
| Jonas Valančiūnas (23)
| Jonas Valančiūnas (14)
| Devonte' Graham (6)
| Footprint Center14,323
| 1–7
|-style="background:#fcc;"
| 9
| November 3
| @ Sacramento
| 
| Alexander-Walker, Graham (16)
| Jonas Valančiūnas (11)
| Devonte' Graham (7)
| Golden 1 Center12,480
| 1–8
|-style="background:#fcc;"
| 10
| November 5
| @ Golden State
| 
| Jonas Valančiūnas (12)
| Jonas Valančiūnas (15)
| Satoranský, Valančiūnas (4)
| Chase Center18,064
| 1–9
|-style="background:#fcc;"
| 11
| November 8
| @ Dallas
| 
| Hart, Valančiūnas (22)
| Jonas Valančiūnas (11)
| Devonte' Graham (10)
| American Airlines Center19,231
| 1–10
|-style="background:#fcc;"
| 12
| November 10
| Oklahoma City
| 
| Nickeil Alexander-Walker (33)
| Jonas Valančiūnas (15)
| Garrett Temple (5)
| Smoothie King Center15,355
| 1–11
|-style="background:#fcc;"
| 13
| November 12
| Brooklyn
| 
| Jonas Valančiūnas (20)
| Jonas Valančiūnas (12)
| Graham, Satoransky (6)
| Smoothie King Center14,650
| 1–12
|-style="background:#cfc;"
| 14
| November 13
| Memphis
| 
| Nickeil Alexander-Walker (21)
| Jonas Valančiūnas (9)
| Jonas Valančiūnas (9)
| Smoothie King Center14,358
| 2–12
|-style="background:#fcc;"
| 15
| November 15
| @ Washington
| 
| Brandon Ingram (31)
| Josh Hart (12)
| Josh Hart (5)
| Capital One Arena13,914
| 2–13
|-style="background:#fcc;"
| 16
| November 17
| @ Miami
| 
| Nickeil Alexander-Walker (24)
| Jonas Valančiūnas (8)
| Brandon Ingram (5)
| FTX Arena19,600
| 2–14
|-style="background:#cfc;"
| 17
| November 19
| L.A. Clippers
| 
| Jonas Valančiūnas (26)
| Jonas Valančiūnas (13)
| Brandon Ingram (5)
| Smoothie King Center15,274
| 3–14
|-style="background:#fcc;"
| 18
| November 20
| @ Indiana
| 
| Jonas Valančiūnas (19)
| Jonas Valančiūnas (13)
| Alexander-Walker, Ingram (4)
| Gainbridge Fieldhouse15,081
| 3–15
|-style="background:#fcc;"
| 19
| November 22
| Minnesota
| 
| Willy Hernangómez (19)
| Willy Hernangómez (11)
| Kira Lewis Jr. (6)
| Smoothie King Center15,689
| 3–16
|-style="background:#cfc;"
| 20
| November 24
| Washington
| 
| Brandon Ingram (26)
| Jonas Valančiūnas (11)
| Alexander-Walker, Satoranský (5)
| Smoothie King Center14,659
| 4–16
|-style="background:#cfc;"
| 21
| November 26
| @ Utah
| 
| Brandon Ingram (21) 
| Jonas Valančiūnas (10)
| Hart, Hernangómez, Ingram (5)
| Vivint Arena18,306
| 5–16
|-style="background:#fcc;"
| 22
| November 27
| @ Utah
|  
| Jaxson Hayes (15)
| Jonas Valančiūnas (12)
| Jose Alvarado (5)
| Vivint Arena18,306
| 5–17
|-style="background:#cfc;"
| 23
| November 29
| @ L.A. Clippers
| 
| Jonas Valančiūnas (39)
| Jonas Valančiūnas (15)
| Josh Hart (12)
| Staples Center15,691
| 6–17

|-style="background:#fcc;"
| 24
| December 1
| Dallas 
| 
| Brandon Ingram (29)
| Hernangómez, Valančiūnas (5)
| Devonte' Graham (6)
| Smoothie King Center15,558
| 6–18
|-style="background:#cfc;"
| 25
| December 3
| @ Dallas
| 
| Brandon Ingram (24)
| Willy Hernangómez (14)
| Brandon Ingram (12)
| American Airlines Center19,218
| 7–18
|-style="background:#fcc;"
| 26
| December 5
| @ Houston 
| 
| Brandon Ingram (40)
| Willy Hernangómez (14)
| Nickeil Alexander-Walker (5)
| Toyota Center14,771
| 7–19
|-style="background:#fcc;"
| 27
| December 8
| Denver 
| 
| Jonas Valančiūnas (27)
| Jonas Valančiūnas (11)
| Josh Hart (8)
| Smoothie King Center15,035
| 7–20
|-style="background:#cfc;"
| 28
| December 10
| Detroit 
| 
| Brandon Ingram (26)
| Josh Hart (13)
| Hart, Ingram (5)
| Smoothie King Center15,828
| 8–20
|-style="background:#fcc;"
| 29
| December 12
| @ San Antonio 
| 
| Brandon Ingram (27)
| Jonas Valančiūnas (12)
| Brandon Ingram (9)
| AT&T Center14,990
| 8–21
|-style="background:#cfc;"
| 30
| December 15
| @ Oklahoma City 
| 
| Brandon Ingram (34)
| Jonas Valančiūnas (16)
| Devonte' Graham (8)
| Paycom Center13,253
| 9–21
|-style="background:#cfc;"
| 31
| December 17
| Milwaukee 
| 
| Devonte' Graham (26)
| Josh Hart (15)
| Josh Hart (8)
| Smoothie King Center15,504
| 10–21
|- style="background:#ccc;"
| -
| December 19
| @ Philadelphia 
| colspan="6"|Postponed (Makeup date: January 25)
|-style="background:#cfc;"
| 32
| December 21
| Portland 
| 
| Brandon Ingram (28)
| Jonas Valančiūnas (16)
| Brandon Ingram (8)
| Smoothie King Center15,272
| 11–21
|-style="background:#cfc;"
| 33
| December 23
| @ Orlando 
| 
| Brandon Ingram (31)
| Willy Hernangómez (16) 
| Devonte' Graham (6)
| Amway Center13,954
| 12–21
|-style="background:#fcc;"
| 34
| December 26
| @ Oklahoma City
|  
| Josh Hart (29)
| Josh Hart (10)
| Devonte' Graham (8)
| Paycom Center15,608
| 12–22
|-style="background:#cfc;"
| 35
| December 28
| Cleveland 
|  
| Herbert Jones (26)
| Jonas Valančiūnas (10)
| Graham, Satoranský (5)
| Smoothie King Center15,835
| 13–22
|-

|-style="background:#fcc;"
| 36
| January 1
| @ Milwaukee 
|  
| Jaxson Hayes (23)
| Josh Hart (11)
| Josh Hart (9)
| Fiserv Forum17,341
| 13–23
|-style="background:#fcc;"
| 37
| January 3
| Utah 
|  
| Jonas Valančiūnas (25)
| Hart, Valančiūnas (9)
| Brandon Ingram (7)
| Smoothie King Center15,057
| 13–24
|- style="background:#fcc;"
| 38
| January 4
| Phoenix 
|  
| Devonte' Graham (28) 
| Jonas Valančiūnas (16)
| Devonte' Graham (6)
| Smoothie King Center15,158 
| 13–25
|-style="background:#cfc;"
| 39
| January 6
| Golden State 
|  
| Brandon Ingram (32)
| Brandon Ingram (11)
| Brandon Ingram (6)
| Smoothie King Center15,986
| 14–25
|-style="background:#fcc;"
| 40
| January 9
| @ Toronto 
| 
| Brandon Ingram (22) 
| Jonas Valančiūnas (17)
| Garrett Temple (6)
| Scotiabank Arena0
| 14–26
|-style="background:#cfc;"
| 41
| January 11
| Minnesota 
| 
| Brandon Ingram (33)
| Jonas Valančiūnas (12)
| Brandon Ingram (9)  
| Smoothie King Center15,155
| 15–26
|-style="background:#cfc;"
| 42
| January 13
| L.A. Clippers 
| 
| Brandon Ingram (24)
| Jonas Valančiūnas (16)
| Devonte' Graham (7)
| Smoothie King Center15,406 
| 16–26
|-style="background:#fcc;"
| 43
| January 15
| @ Brooklyn 
| 
| Brandon Ingram (22)
| Josh Hart (11)
| Brandon Ingram (8) 
| Barclays Center17,034
| 16–27 
|-style="background:#fcc;"
| 44
| January 17
| @ Boston 
| 
| Jonas Valančiūnas (22)
| Jonas Valančiūnas (14)
| Brandon Ingram (6)
| TD Garden19,156
| 16–28 
|-style="background:#cfc;"
| 45
| January 20
| @ New York 
| 
| Jonas Valančiūnas (18)
| Jonas Valančiūnas (10)
| Brandon Ingram (6)  
| Madison Square Garden16,168 
| 17–28
|-style="background:#cfc;"
| 46
| January 24
| Indiana 
|  
| Devonte' Graham (25)
| Jonas Valančiūnas (12)
| Alexander-Walker, Graham, Valančiūnas (6)
| Smoothie King Center15,581
| 18–28
|-style="background:#fcc;"
| 47
| January 25
| @ Philadelphia 
|  
| Nickeil Alexander-Walker (31)
| Willy Hernangómez (10)
| Alexander-Walker, Alvarado, Satoranský (6) 
| Wells Fargo Center20,121
| 18–29 
|-style="background:#fcc;"
| 48
| January 28
| Denver 
|  
| Herbert Jones (19)
| Willy Hernangómez (16)
| Devonte' Graham (5)
| Smoothie King Center15,254 
| 18–30
|-style="background:#fcc;"
| 49
| January 29
| Boston 
| 
| Jose Alvarado (19)
| Josh Hart (13)
| Nickeil Alexander-Walker (5)
| Smoothie King Center16,168
| 18–31
|-style="background:#fcc;"
| 50
| January 31
| Cleveland 
| 
| Devonte' Graham (20)
| Hart, Hernangómez (10)
| Nickeil Alexander-Walker (5)
| Rocket Mortgage FieldHouse17,637
| 18–32 
|-

|-style="background:#cfc;"
| 51
| February 1
| @ Detroit 
| 
| Brandon Ingram (26)
| Jonas Valančiūnas (13)
| Jose Alvarado (6)
| Little Caesars Arena15,499
| 19–32 
|-style="background:#cfc;"
| 52
| February 4
| @ Denver 
| 
| Herbert Jones (25)
| Jaxson Hayes (11)
| Brandon Ingram (12)
| Ball Arena16,152
| 20–32
|-style="background:#cfc;"
| 53
| February 6
| @ Houston 
| 
| Brandon Ingram (33)
| Hart, Hayes (7) 
| Brandon Ingram (12)
| Toyota Center15,702
| 21–32
|-style="background:#cfc;"
| 54
| February 8
| Houston
| 
| Brandon Ingram (26)
| Herbert Jones (11)
| Devonte' Graham (8)
| Smoothie King Center15,121
| 22–32 
|-style="background:#fcc;"
| 55
| February 10
| Miami
| 
| Jose Alvarado (17)
| Valančiūnas, Clark (9)
| CJ McCollum (5)
| Smoothie King Center16,672
| 22–33
|-style="background:#fcc;"
| 56
| February 12
| San Antonio
| 
| CJ McCollum (36)
| Jonas Valančiūnas (12)
| Graham, McCollum (5)
| Smoothie King Center16,615
| 22–34
|-style="background:#cfc;"
| 57
| February 14
| Toronto
| 
| CJ McCollum (23)
| Brandon Ingram (11)
| Brandon Ingram (8)
| Smoothie King Center15,319
| 23–34 
|-style="background:#fcc;"
| 58
| February 15
| Memphis
| 
| CJ McCollum (30)
| CJ McCollum (6)
| CJ McCollum (7)
| Smoothie King Center15,901
| 23–35
|-style="background:#fcc;"
| 59
| February 17
| Dallas
| 
| CJ McCollum (38)
| Jonas Valančiūnas (18)
| Brandon Ingram (8)
| Smoothie King Center15,906
| 23–36
|-style="background:#cfc;"
| 60
| February 25
| @ Phoenix
|  
| CJ McCollum (32) 
| Jonas Valančiūnas (17)
| Brandon Ingram (7)
| Footprint Center17,071
| 24–36 
|-style="background:#cfc;"
| 61
| February 28
| @ L.A. Lakers
|  
| CJ McCollum (22)
| Jonas Valančiūnas (10)
| Ingram, McCollum (10)
| Crypto.com Arena17,536
| 25–36
|-

|-style="background:#cfc;"
| 62
| March 2
| Sacramento
|  
| Brandon Ingram (33)
| Jonas Valančiūnas (14)
| CJ McCollum (9)
| Smoothie King Center15,490
| 26–36
|-style="background:#cfc;"
| 63
| March 4
| Utah
|  
| Brandon Ingram (29)
| Hernangómez, Ingram (8)
| Brandon Ingram (6)
| Smoothie King Center16,178
| 27–36
|-style="background:#fcc;"
| 64
| March 6
| @ Denver
|  
| Brandon Ingram (38)
| Jonas Valančiūnas (14) 
| Ingram, McCollum (9)
| Ball Arena14,962
| 27–37
|-style="background:#fcc;"
| 65
| March 8
| @ Memphis
|  
| CJ McCollum (32)
| Willy Hernangómez (9) 
| CJ McCollum (11) 
| FedEx Forum16,433
| 27–38
|-style="background:#fcc;"
| 66
| March 9
| Orlando
|  
| CJ McCollum (32)
| Jonas Valančiūnas (15) 
| CJ McCollum (8)
| Smoothie King Center15,633
| 27–39
|-style="background:#fcc;"
| 67
| March 11
| Charlotte
| 
| Trey Murphy III (32)
| Trey Murphy III (9) 
| Herbert Jones (8)
| Smoothie King Center16,838
| 27–40
|-style="background:#cfc;"
| 68
| March 13
| Houston
| 
| Jonas Valančiūnas (32)
| Marshall, Valančiūnas (10)
| Jose Alvarado (10)
| Smoothie King Center15,683
| 28–40
|-style="background:#fcc;"
| 69
| March 15
| Phoenix
| 
| Herbert Jones (22)
| Jonas Valančiūnas (12)
| CJ McCollum (9) 
| Smoothie King Center16,789
| 28–41
|-style="background:#cfc;"
| 70
| March 18
| @ San Antonio
| 
| CJ McCollum (20) 
| Jonas Valančiūnas (12)
| Jose Alvarado (5)
| AT&T Center18,354
| 29–41
|-style="background:#cfc;"
| 71
| March 20
| @ Atlanta
|  
| Jonas Valančiūnas (26)
| Hayes, Valančiūnas (12)
| CJ McCollum (8)
| State Farm Arena17,123
| 30–41
|-style="background:#fcc;"
| 72
| March 21
| @ Charlotte
|  
| CJ McCollum (27) 
| Jonas Valančiūnas (18)
| CJ McCollum (6)
| Spectrum Center13,351
| 30–42
|-style="background:#cfc;"
| 73
| March 24
| Chicago
|  
| Devonte' Graham (30)
| Jonas Valančiūnas (19) 
| Jose Alvarado (7)
| Smoothie King Center13,973
| 31–42
|-style="background:#fcc;"
| 74
| March 26
| San Antonio
|   
| CJ McCollum (32)
| Jonas Valančiūnas (11)  
| Jonas Valančiūnas (6) 
| Smoothie King Center13,097
| 31–43
|-style="background:#cfc;"
| 75
| March 27
| L.A. Lakers
|    
| Brandon Ingram (26)
| Jonas Valančiūnas (12)  
| CJ McCollum (6)
| Smoothie King Center18,516
| 32–43
|-style="background:#cfc;"
| 76
| March 30
| @ Portland
|   
| CJ McCollum (25)
| Jonas Valančiūnas (11)  
| Brandon Ingram (6)
| Moda Center18,551
| 33–43
|-

|-style="background:#cfc;"
| 77
| April 1
| @ L.A. Lakers
| 
| CJ McCollum (32)
| Jonas Valančiūnas (12)  
| Brandon Ingram (7) 
| Crypto.com Arena18,997
| 34–43
|-style="background:#fcc;"
| 78
| April 3
| @ L.A. Clippers
| 
| CJ McCollum (19)
| Jaxson Hayes (10)
| Ingram, McCollum (4)
| Crypto.com Arena19,068
| 34–44
|-style="background:#cfc;"
| 79
| April 5
| @ Sacramento
| 
| Hayes, McCollum (23)
| Hayes, Hernangómez (12)
| Brandon Ingram (8)
| Golden 1 Center16,047
| 35–44
|-style="background:#cfc;"
| 80
| April 7
| Portland
| 
| CJ McCollum (23)
| Willy Hernangómez (14) 
| Jose Alvarado (7)
| Smoothie King Center12,432
| 36–44
|-style="background:#fcc;"
| 81
| April 9
| @ Memphis
| 
| CJ McCollum (16)
| Willy Hernangómez (10) 
| Jose Alvarado (5)
| FedEx Forum17,207
| 36–45
|-style="background:#fcc;"
| 82
| April 10
| Golden State
| 
| Naji Marshall (19)
|  Willy Hernangómez (9) 
| Jared Harper (9)
| Smoothie King Center16,595
| 36–46
|-

Play-in

|- style="background:#cfc;"
| 1
| April 13
| San Antonio
| 
| CJ McCollum (32)
| Jonas Valančiūnas (14)
| CJ McCollum (7)
| Smoothie King Center18,610
| 1–0
|- style="background:#cfc;"
| 2
| April 15
| @ L.A. Clippers
| 
| Brandon Ingram (30)
| Larry Nance Jr. (16)
| Brandon Ingram (6)
| Crypto.com Arena19,068
| 2–0

Playoffs

Game log

|- style="background:#fcc;"
| 1
| April 17
| @ Phoenix
| 
| CJ McCollum (25)
| Jonas Valančiūnas (25)
| CJ McCollum (6)
| Footprint Center17,071
| 0–1
|- style="background:#cfc;"
| 2
| April 19
| @ Phoenix
| 
| Brandon Ingram (37)
| Jonas Valančiūnas (13)
| Ingram, McCollum (9)
| Footprint Center17,071
| 1–1
|- style="background:#fcc;"
| 3
| April 22
| Phoenix
| 
| Brandon Ingram (34)
| Jonas Valančiūnas (11)
| Ingram, McCollum (7)
| Smoothie King Center18,962
| 1–2
|- style="background:#cfc;"
| 4
| April 24
| Phoenix
| 
| Brandon Ingram (30)
| Jonas Valančiūnas (15)
| Brandon Ingram (5)
| Smoothie King Center18,962
| 2–2
|- style="background:#fcc;"
| 5
| April 26
| @ Phoenix
| 
| Brandon Ingram (22)
| Jonas Valančiūnas (14)
| Ingram, McCollum (5)
| Footprint Center17,071
| 2–3
|- style="background:#fcc;"
| 6
| April 28
| Phoenix
| 
| Brandon Ingram (21)
| Nance, Valančiūnas (8)
| Brandon Ingram (11)
| Smoothie King Center18,710
| 2–4

Transactions

Trades

References 

New Orleans Pelicans
New Orleans Pelicans seasons
New Orleans Pelicans
New Orleans Pelicans